

Canadian Football News in 1923
Calgary Tigers were renamed the 50th Battalion.

Queen's defeats Regina 54–0 as Queen's scored a record nine touchdowns on December 1.

Regular season

Final regular season standings
Note: GP = Games Played, W = Wins, L = Losses, T = Ties, PF = Points For, PA = Points Against, Pts = Points

* Parkdale forfeited last game to Hamilton, 0-0 

These two games were actually a playoff to see who would play Calgary 50th Battalion in the finals. The results from the full season are unknown.

League Champions

Grey Cup playoffs
Note: All dates in 1923

ARFU Finals

The second game was cancelled and the Edmonton Eskimos win the ARFU championship. Game was originally scheduled for November 3 but it had to be moved up to accommodate the western playoff versus Regina. Calgary was unable to organize its players on short notice for a mid-week game in Edmonton.

West semifinal

West finalRegina advances to the Grey Cup.East semifinalHamilton Tigers advances to the East Final.East finalQueen's advances to the Grey Cup.Playoff bracket

Grey Cup Championship

1923 Toronto Globe Eastern All-StarsNOTE: During this time most players played both ways, so the All-Star selections do not distinguish between some offensive and defensive positions.''
FW - ??? Douglas, Parkdale Rowing Club
HB - Pep Leadley, Queen's University
HB - Warren Snyder, University of Toronto
HB - Harry Batstone, Queen's University
QB - Johnny Evans, Queen's University
C  - Ernie Cox, Hamilton Tigers
G  - ??? Tuck, Hamilton Tigers
G  - Brian Timmins, Ottawa Rough Riders
T  - John McKelvey, Queen's University
T  - Gear Elford, Hamilton Rowing Club
E  - Cap Fear, Toronto Argonauts
E  - Bud Thomas, Queen's University

References

 
Canadian Football League seasons